The 2002–03 Rugby Pro D2 season was the 2002–03 second division of French club rugby union. There is promotion and relegation in Pro Rugby D2, and after the 2002–03 season, CA Brive and Montpellier RC were promoted to the top level, and US Marmande and Aubenas Vals were relegated to third division.

Standings

Semi-finals
 Brive 13 - 22 Tarbes
 Montpellier 28 - 24 Auch

Final
 Tarbes 21 - 25 Montpellier

See also
 Rugby union in France

External links
 LNR.fr
 Table

2002–03
Pro D2